Events from 2020 in Tokelau.

Incumbents 

 Administrator: Ross Ardern
 Head of Government: Kerisiano Kalolo

Events 
Ongoing – COVID-19 pandemic in Oceania

 3 April – Even though the territory had no cases, boats arriving from affected countries were banned from landing.
 19 March – All incoming travel was suspended, except for Tokelauans.

Deaths

References 

2020 in Tokelau
2020s in Tokelau
Years of the 21st century in Tokelau
Tokelau